The Jaroslav Seifert Prize (Czech: Cena Jaroslava Seiferta) is a prestigious Czech literary prize created by the Charta 77 Foundation in Stockholm in January 1986.  This prize is named after the Nobel Prize–winning Czechoslovak writer, poet and journalist, Jaroslav Seifert,  and is awarded for an excellent work of poetry or fiction published (or otherwise made public) in the past three years in the Czech Republic or abroad. It was originally awarded to authors in exile during the Soviet era. The laureate is announced on September 22 each year, on the eve of Seifert's birthday anniversary. As of 2013, the prize is awarded every two years.

Laureates

See also
List of Czech literary awards

References

External links
  List of laureates

Czech literary awards
Awards established in 1986
Literary awards honoring writers